Jane Gazzo is an Australian television presenter, radio presenter, performance and club DJ, television personality, voice artist, author, and music journalist.

Early life and education
Gazzo was born and raised in Melbourne and is the daughter of a Melbourne clothes designer. She graduated from La Trobe University in Melbourne with a Bachelor of Arts degree in Media and Cinema.

Career

Early career in Australia
It was in her mature teenage years that she joined 3RRR Radio in Melbourne, presenting a Sunday afternoon (4pm-7pm) new music show called Calamity. She also began contributing stories to the UK's Q magazine and Dolly Australia under the name Calamity Jane.

She later became well known as a result of her national radio and TV shows, including Triple J radio's Super Request and ABC Television's live three-hour Saturday morning program, Recovery. It was on this TV show that she interviewed some of the world's biggest international bands as they toured Australia.

In 1992, Gazzo formed a punk band, "Rubher", as lead singer. They released 2 EPs through Mushroom Records before disbanding in 1996. In May 2018, Jane reformed the group for a one-off show with The Mavis's.

In 1998, she recorded with Australian band Underground Lovers, under the Japanese pseudonym "Mitsuame"; covering Can's 1976 song "I Want More" (from their album, Flow Motion)

UK (1999–2007) 
Gazzo relocated to London, England in 1999, sharing a flat with The Prodigy founding member and former dancer Sharky. In London, she first worked at numerous jobs, including a summer at the Rough Trade record shop, promotions at Virgin Records and DJ'ing at Alan McGee's Death Disco.

In 2000 she became a presenter on the London radio station XFM (Weekend Breakfast). Her time there included a three-week stint producing Russell Brand on-air before he was sacked by the station for bringing in a homeless man.
She later joined its parent station Capital FM, presenting the Capital Top 30 Album Chart Show and The Rock Show.

Gazzo made her UK Television debut in 2001 presenting an eight-part music series called "Play Loud" on BBC TV channel Play UK.

In 2001 she also briefly worked for Courtney Love, sharing a London house with the former Hole lead singer.

Her presenting work has also led to involvement with charities. In February 2006 she hosted the first ever Cancer Research UK "Rock Memorabilia" auction at Abbey Road Studios, helping to raise £130,000.

She joined BBC Radio 6 Music in 2002, and presented Jane Gazzo's Dream Ticket from June 2004 to September 2005, as well as other BBC Radio 6 Music shows and specials. In a May 2005 article in The Independent (UK), Jane Gazzo's Dream Ticket radio show was mentioned in a characterisation of BBC Radio 6 Music as "The best thing is Dream Ticket, where you imagine you're at some of the greatest gigs ever". In December 2005, she returned to BBC Radio 6 Music, presenting various music shows.

In 2006 Gazzo presented pre-recorded music shows on VH-2 TV in the UK as well as the "Download" in-flight radio show on Emirates Airlines (described as "the best modern rock and alternative from some of today's top bands").In January 2007 she joined Rockworld TV, presenting and interviewing various artists.

Gazzo also reported from important music festivals and award shows in the UK, including Glastonbury Music Festival, Reading Music Festival, the Brit Awards, the Metal Hammer Awards, the NME awards and the Mercury Music Awards, and in 2004 she was invited to be a judge at the Sony Radio Academy Awards.

She also DJ'd at various festivals and venues around the UK including All Tomorrow's Parties music festival in Camber Sands as well as Death Disco, Camden Lock, Keston Lodge, Latitude Festival and Defectors Weld venues in London.

Australia (2007–present) 
In May 2007 Jane returned to Australia to join Foxtel music Channel V as daily presenter and VJ. She co-hosted the whatUwant daily request show, as well as artist and festival specials. Her first major broadcast for Channel [V] was presenting the network's Live Earth coverage from Sydney Football Stadium on 7 July 2007. She has also presented from the Homebake festival, Splendour in the Grass, the ARIA Awards red carpet, Sound Relief and the Big Day Out.

From late 2010, Jane became a co-host on Channel [V]'s The Riff. She shared the presentation job with Danny Clayton, Billy Russell and Kyle Linahan (later replaced by Carrissa Walford.) The programme was broadcast weekly on Saturday mornings. She also hosted the daily music news programme "WTF" three times a week.

In June 2012, Gazzo moved to Max, a 24-hour music platform on Foxtel as a full-time host and VJ, presenting countdowns and interviews.

In February 2015, Jane became morning presenter on Triple M in Melbourne. She also hosted the national Australian music show "Homegrown" and the syndicated celebrity show "My Generation". After 3 years, Gazzo left the station to concentrate on freelancing media work.

In August 2019, Jane was chosen as the opening DJ for Hugh Jackman, on the Melbourne leg of his Australian concerts at Rod Laver Arena, playing six shows as his main support act.

In 2020, Jane hosted weekly music program The Sound on the ABC under the tutelage of the late Michael Gudinski.

Other activities
From 2015 until 2020, Gazzo served on the board of management for government youth organisation The Push.

In 2017, she was appointed Chair of the Music Advisory Board for the Australian Music Vault at the Arts Centre Melbourne.

Selected publications
Gazzo's first book, a biography of Australian singer John Farnham, John Farnham: The Untold Story, was released in February 2015 through Random House.

Her second book, "Sound as Ever! A Celebration of the Best Decade in Australian Music 1990-1999" was released in September 2022, through Melbourne Books, co-authored with music journalist Andrew P Street.

Awards 
In June 2011 and 2012 Gazzo was nominated for Favourite Female Television Personality at the 9th & 10th Annual Astra Awards.

In August 2018 and 2019 Gazzo, along with co-host Phil O'Neil was nominated for an ACRA award for Best Syndicated Radio Program for 'My Generation' on the Triple M network at the 30th and 31st ACRA's. 

|-
| 2019 Australian Women in Music Awards
| Jane Gazzo
| Music Journalist Award
| 
|-
| 2021 Australian Women in Music Awards
| Jane Gazzo
| Music Journalist Award
|

Music video appearances 
Appearances in music videos include:
(1991) 'Hell Hoping' – The Welcome Mat
(1992) 'Spirit of Man' – The Truth
(2016) 'Down Like Flies' – Scott Darlow
(2018) 'Don't Lose It' – The Living End

Notes

Further reading
 "Jane Gazzo: Radio Host Triple M". oneofone.com.au, 18 June 2015.
 "Even Finance can Rock'n'Roll", The Sydney Morning Herald, 5 February 2012. Interview with Jane Gazzo.
"Jane Gazzo on her Media Career Highlights" , FasterLouder, April 2012
Leith, William, "Rockabye Babes – Women in UK Radio", The Observer, Sunday, 4 February 2001.

External links

BBC Radio 6 Music presenters
British radio personalities
British radio DJs
British women radio presenters
British women journalists
British music critics
British women music critics
Australian television actresses
Triple J announcers
1977 births
Living people
Television personalities from Melbourne
Australian people of Italian descent
Australian people of Sicilian descent
Australian television presenters
La Trobe University alumni
Australian music critics
Australian women music critics
Australian women journalists
Australian music journalists
Australian VJs (media personalities)
Australian women radio presenters
Australian women television presenters